Helen E. Blackwell (born 1972) is an American organic chemist and chemical biologist. She is a professor at the University of Wisconsin–Madison.

Education
Blackwell is a native of Shaker Heights, Ohio and was educated as an undergraduate at Oberlin College, receiving a Bachelor of Arts degree in chemistry in 1994. She received a Ph.D. in organic chemistry from the California Institute of Technology in 1999 working with Robert Grubbs.

Career and research
Nearing the end of her doctoral education in 1999, Blackwell gained an interest in biology and joined Stuart Schreiber's lab at Harvard University. At the time, the lab was focusing on animal models, but Blackwell decided to work with plants. During her research, Blackwell identified several small-molecule sirtuin inhibitors in Arabidopsis plants.

Blackwell's research utilizes chemical probes—synthesized using solution-phase and solid-phase synthesis, and combinatorial chemistry—to better understand bacterial communication and interactions between a microbe and its host, more specifically, how plants and animals react to microbe invasion, and how bacteria use quorum sensing to determine when to attack their host.

Blackwell is a fellow of the American Association for the Advancement of Science, and has received the Agnes Fay Morgan Research Award.

Publications

References

Living people
21st-century American chemists
University of Wisconsin–Madison faculty
Oberlin College alumni
California Institute of Technology alumni
1972 births